John Zápolya or Szapolyai (1490/91 – 22 July 1540), was King of Hungary (as John I) from 1526 to 1540. His rule was disputed by Archduke Ferdinand I, who also claimed the title King of Hungary. He was Voivode of Transylvania before his coronation, from 1510 to 1526.

Rise of the Szápolya family 
John was the oldest son of Count Stephen Zápolya and his second wife, Hedwig of Cieszyn. Stephen Zápolya was descended from a Croatian noble family from Slavonia. Their family name was derived from the Croatian phrase "za polje" (literally translated as "behind field"). Stephen became one of the wealthiest lords in the Kingdom of Hungary after inheriting the large domains of his brother, Emeric Zápolya, in 1487. Stephen Zápolya's marriage with the Silesian duchess, Hedwig, who was related to Emperor Maximilian I, increased the prestige of the Zápolya family.

Habsburg-Jagiellon war of succession

Stephen Zápolya had no sons when Matthias Corvinus, King of Hungary, died on 6 April 1490, according to a contemporaneous report, but a charter issued in September 1491 already mentioned John, showing that John was born between the two dates. Stephen Zápolya became Palatine of the Kingdom of Hungary from 1492 until his death in 1499.

Vladislaus's brother, King Sigismund Jagiellon of Poland, came to Hungary to mediate between the royal family and the Zápolyas in late June. Emperor Maximilian had already in September declared war on Hungary, because he wanted to protect his claim (acknowledged in the 1491 Peace of Pressburg) to succeed Vladislaus. The teenager Stephen Zápolya was made one of the commanders of the Hungarian army. During the war, the envoys of King Vladislaus and Maximilian signed a secret treaty on 30 March 1506 about the marriage of Vladislaus's daughter, Anne Jagiellon, and Maximilian's grandson, Ferdinand.

Childhood 
John was born in Szepes Castle (now Spiš Castle in Slovakia), which was an important center of the Zápolyas' domains. At the Diet of Hungary in 1497, Stephen Zápolya's opponents circulated rumours about his intention to have his son crowned king. John and his younger brother, George, inherited their father's vast domains in 1499. Their domains were primarily located in Upper Hungary (now Slovakia), where they held most landed estates in five counties. John could write letters in Latin, showing that his mother provided excellent education to him. Hedwig of Cieszyn wanted to persuade Vladislaus II, King of Hungary and Bohemia, to marry his only child, Anne, to John. However king Vladislaus refused the idea of marriage between princess Anne and John Zápolya.

Party leader of the gentries 

 
John began his public career in 1505 as a member of the Diet of Rákos. Due to John Zápolya's motion, the new Diet at Rákos passed a bill which prohibited the election of a foreigner as king if Vladislaus died without a male issue, on 13 October 1505. The bill was aimed at creating a legal basis for John's ascension to the throne after the death of Vladislaus, but the king refused to ratify it, and the Diet was closed by the king. Moreover, King Vladislaus's wife, Anne of Foix-Candale, gave birth to a son, Louis, on 1 July, 1506.

John's serious conflicts with the royal court had meanwhile made him the leader of a "national party", consisting of the smaller untitled noblemen (the gentry) who were opposed to the pro-Habsburg orientation of the higher aristocracy, the higher clergy and King Vladislaus. Although the Diet initially refused to enact the right of the infant crown prince Louis to succeed king Vladislaus, but Louis was finally crowned on Vladislaus's demand on 4 June 1508. According to the late 16th-century historian Miklós Istvánffy, John tried to persuade Vladislaus to give princess Anne in marriage to him when the king returned from Bohemia in early 1510, but the king refused him again.

Voivode of Transylvania 

Vladislaus II made John Zápolya Voivode of Transylvania and Count of the Székelys on 8 November 1510. He moved to Transylvania and took up residence in Kolozsvár (now Cluj-Napoca in Romania) in March 1511. The Ottomans began invading the southern frontier of the Kingdom of Hungary in April 1511. John regularly held Diets for the representatives of the "Three Nations of Transylvania". He also headed the judicial assemblies of the Székely people.

Vladislaus's brother, Polish king Sigismund I the Old, married John's younger sister, Barbara Zápolya in early 1512, which further increased the influence of the Zápolya family in short term, because Barbara had died in Krakow in 1515.  To show off his wealth, John went with Barbara to Poland accompanied by 800 horsemen who wore gilded cloths. John made a raid in Ottoman Bulgaria in summer 1513. After returning to Transylvania, he crushed a revolt in Hermanstadt (now Sibiu in Romania) and forced the townspeople to pay an extraordinary tax.

Tamás Bakócz, Archbishop of Esztergom, declared a crusade against the Ottomans on 9 April 1514. About 40,000 peasants joined the crusade and assembled near Pest, although their lords had tried to retain them before the harvest. John launched a new campaign to Bulgaria in early May. An army of armed serfs also left Pest to invade the Ottoman Empire. During their march, they began plundering the nearby manors of noblemen. Many villagers denied to pay taxes and duties. The king and the archbishop ordered the peasants to disband on 22 May, but they refused to obey. Their bands took control of the southern lowlands along the rivers Danube and Tisza and murdered many nobles. The main army of the peasants, which was under the command of György Dózsa, laid siege to Temesvár (now Timișoara in Romania). Stephen Báthory defended the town. John Zápolya, who had returned from his Ottoman campaign, came to relieve Temesvár. His army routed the peasants on 15 July.

The leaders of the revolt were tortured to death with much cruelty. Dózsa was put on a red-hot iron "throne" with a red-hot iron "crown" on his head and his compatriots were compelled to eat his flesh, before being executed. In October, the Diet deprived the peasants of the right to free movement and obliged them to work on their lords' lands without remuneration one day in every week. The Diet hailed John Zápolya as the "liberator of the realm" and rewarded him with a payment of 20 denars for each peasant household. Mostly Zápolya's supporters were delegated to the royal council and his friend, Gregory Frankopan, Archbishop of Kalocsa, was made chancellor. The previous chancellor, George Szatmári, Archbishop of Esztergom, remained hostile to Zápolya.

Zápolya, Stephen Báthory, Emeric Török and Michael Paksy joined forces to laid siege to Žrnov, the Ottoman fortress near Nándorfehérvár (now Belgrade in Serbia) in April 1515. However, Sinan, Bey of Smederovo, defeated their united troops. The defeat weakened Zápolya's position.

King of Hungary
In 1526, the Ottoman Empire crushed the Hungarian royal army in the Battle of Mohács and killed King Louis II. Zápolya was en route to the battlefield with his sizable army but did not participate in the battle for unknown reasons. The Ottomans sacked the royal capital of Buda and occupied Syrmia, then withdrew from Hungary. The last three months of the year were marked by a power vacuum; political authority was in a state of collapse, yet the victors chose not to impose their rule.

Two candidates stepped into the breach. One was Zápolya, voivode of Transylvania and Hungary's most prominent aristocrat as well as commander of an intact army. The other was Archduke Ferdinand of Austria, the late king's brother-in-law and brother of Holy Roman Emperor Charles V, who claimed Hungary for the House of Habsburg.

The majority of Hungary's untitled lesser nobility (the gentry) backed Zápolya, who for fifteen years had been playing a leading role in Hungarian political life. Part of the aristocracy acknowledged his leadership, and he enjoyed the enthusiastic support – not always reciprocated – of the lesser nobility. Most of his opponents succumbed at Mohács: the Hungarian branch of the Jagiellon dynasty became defunct, and its pro-Habsburg following was decimated.
The higher nobility of Hungary (the magnates or barons) sided with Ferdinand, and gathered in Pozsony for Ferdinand's election. The German dynasty's main argument – one that many historians would judge to be decisive – was that the Habsburg dynasty could help Hungary fight against the Ottomans. But in 1526, the promise rang empty. Hungary had been fighting the Ottomans for over a century, during which time the Empire and the Habsburgs had offered much encouragement but no tangible help. The likelihood of assistance was further reduced by the conflict of Ferdinand's older brother, Emperor Charles V, and King Francis I of France that once again flared into open war in the summer of 1526. This circumstance led the Voivode to discount the threat lurking behind the Habsburgs' candidacy: that Zápolya's Hungary would have to contend not only with the Ottomans, but also with an attack from the west.

Thus Zápolya took no notice of his rival's protests, nor of those voiced by the few Hungarians who rallied to Ferdinand. On 10 November 1526, Zápolya had himself proclaimed king at the Diet at Székesfehérvár by the lesser nobles (gentry), and he was duly crowned the next day. Ferdinand was also elected king by the magnates, barons, and the Catholic clergy in a rump Diet in Pozsony on 17 December 1526.  

Profiting from nine months of relative calm, John strove to restore state authority. He drew on his vast private wealth, the unconditional support of the lesser nobility, and the assistance of some aristocrats to impose his policies in domestic affairs. However, in the crucial sphere of foreign relations, success eluded him. He sought an entente with the Habsburgs, proposing to form an alliance against the Ottomans, but Ferdinand rejected all attempts at reconciliation. John's envoys fanned out across Europe in quest of support. Only in France did they find a positive response, but even that was ineffective since Francis was intent not on reconciling Hungary and the Habsburgs, but on drawing Hungary into a war against Charles and his family.

Europe's political balance underwent a major shift in the summer of 1527, when, in a somewhat unplanned operation, mercenary forces of the emperor occupied Rome and drove Pope Clement VII, one of France's principal allies, to capitulate. This development freed Ferdinand – who also acquired the Bohemian throne in late 1526 – from the burden of assisting his brother. By then, Ferdinand had developed a Hungarian policy that was fully in keeping with the interests of his realms. He judged that if Hungary, unable to resist the Ottoman Empire, took action independently of Austria and Bohemia, it might well enter into an alliance with the Ottomans against its western neighbors. It was therefore in the interest of Austria and Bohemia that the Habsburgs gain control of Hungary, by force if necessary.

In July 1527, Ferdinand sent an army of German mercenaries into Hungary. The moment was well chosen, for John Zápolya's forces were tied up in the southern counties of Hungary, where Slavonic peasants, incited by Ferdinand, had rebelled; the revolt was led by the 'Black Man', Jovan Nenad. In one sweep, the pro-Habsburg soldiers captured Buda. John hurriedly redeployed his army, but on 27 September in the Battle of Tarcal (near Tokaj), he suffered a bloody defeat. Based on the earlier election of the Diet at Pozsony, Ferdinand was crowned in the Székesfehérvár Basilica on 3 November 1527.

In 1528 John fled Hungary for Poland, where he stayed with Prince Jan Amor Tarnowski. In 1529 John approached the Ottomans, and agreed to make Hungary a vassal state in return for recognition and support. Sultan Suleiman the Magnificent accepted, and sent Ottoman armies to invade Austria (which included the Siege of Vienna), a war which lasted till 1533. This allowed John to regain his position in Hungary in 1529, by the efforts of Frater George Martinuzzi, despite the association with the Ottomans which tainted him at the time. Martinuzzi became royal treasurer and John's most trusted minister.

In 1533, the Ottomans made peace and ceded western Hungary to Ferdinand. Ferdinand now began to press John for control of the rest. In 1538, by the Treaty of Nagyvárad, John designated Ferdinand to be his successor after his death, as he was childless. However, in late January to early February 1539, he married Isabella Jagiellon, and in 15 July 1540 they had a son, John Sigismund. King John died seven days later in 22 July 1540 in Szászsebes (Sebeş).

See also 
 Beatrice of Naples
 First Congress of Vienna
 Ivan Karlović
 Petar Keglević

References

Sources

 
 
 
 
 
 
 
 
 
 
 
 

1487 births
1540 deaths
People from Spišská Nová Ves District
15th-century Hungarian people
16th-century Hungarian people
John I
Eastern Hungarian Kingdom
Kings of Hungary
Kings of Croatia
Dukes of Opole
Voivodes of Transylvania
Counts of the Székelys
Burials at the Basilica of the Assumption of the Blessed Virgin Mary
Hungarian people of Croatian descent
Hungarian people of Lithuanian descent
Hungarian people of Polish descent